Vincere (in English, 'To Win') is a 2009 Italian biographical drama film based on the life of Benito Mussolini's first wife, Ida Dalser. It stars Giovanna Mezzogiorno as Dalser and Filippo Timi as Mussolini. It was filmed under the direction of Marco Bellocchio, who also wrote the screenplay with Daniela Ceselli, and it was released 22 May 2009 in Italy. It was the only Italian film in competition at the 2009 Cannes Film Festival.

It won four Silver Hugos at the Chicago International Film Festival (Best Actor (Filippo Timi), Best Actress (Giovanna Mezzogiorno), Best Director and Best Cinematography (Daniele Ciprì). and won four Silver Ribbon (Actress (Giovanna Mezzogiorno), Cinematography, Editing and Art Direction). Giovanna Mezzogiorno was rewarded with the National Society of Film Critics Award for Best Actress 2010.

Synopsis
The film opens in 1907, with Ida Dalser watching a speech by the young journalist and socialist Benito Mussolini. She immediately falls in love with him, and they begin a torrid affair. Mussolini initially opposes Italian involvement in the European Great War, but then reverses his position. This leads to his expulsion from the Socialist Party, and he develops a new political philosophy, which will become fascism. He decides to start a newspaper to expound his views, and Dalser sells all her belongings to finance it. They have a son, Benito, then Mussolini goes to war, and Dalser does not hear from him for a long time. When she does, he is in hospital recovering from wounds, but when she goes to visit him, she finds that he has a new wife and a daughter. Dalser insists that he is legally married to her, but he denies it.

From then on, Mussolini appears in the film only in newsreels, reflecting the fact that Dalser never sees him in person again. By the early 1920s, he is Italy's leader, and in the process of concluding a concordat with the Vatican. Dalser intensifies her campaign to prove that she is Mussolini's wife and that her son, Benito Albino, is legitimate. She finds that all the might of the fascist state is turned against her. She is committed to an asylum, and when she continues to protest from there by writing to the newspapers, and even to the Pope, Benito Albino is committed to a different asylum. Dalser descends gradually into madness. Although the film ends with a caption listing the official cause for their deaths (Dalser in 1937 and Benito Albino in 1942), the film's last scenes hint at the possibility that one or both of them were murdered.

Cast
Giovanna Mezzogiorno as Ida Dalser
Filippo Timi as both Benito Mussolini and Benito Albino Mussolini
Michela Cescon as Rachele Guidi
Fausto Russo Alesi as Riccardo Paicher
Pier Giorgio Bellocchio as Pietro Fedele
Corrado Invernizzi as Dottor Cappelletti
 Nataliya Kozhenova as Suora

Reception
The film received universal acclaim from film critics, with rating of 85 from the review aggregate site Metacritic, as well as a 92% "fresh" rating from Rotten Tomatoes with the site's consensus being: "Part political treatise, part melodrama, Marco Bellocchio's Mussolini biopic forsakes historical details in favor of absorbing emotion -- and provides a showcase for a stunning performance from Giovanna Mezzogiorno."

Vincere was well received by French critics during the 2009 Cannes Film Festival, and was considered to be a possible Palme d'Or contender, along with Un Prophète from Jacques Audiard and (the eventual winner) The White Ribbon from Michael Haneke.

References

External links

2009 films
2009 romantic drama films
2009 drama films
2009 biographical drama films
2000s Italian-language films
Films directed by Marco Bellocchio
Films about Benito Mussolini
Films about psychiatry
Films set in Milan
Italian drama films
Italian biographical films
Italian historical drama films
Italian biographical drama films
Films set in 1907
Films set in 1922